He Tengjiao (1592–1649), courtesy name Yuncong, was a military officer of the late Ming dynasty who led rebellions against the Qing dynasty. He was from Liping, Guizhou.

His son was He Wenrui (何文瑞), a Southern Ming politician.

Biography 
After obtaining his juren degree in 1621, he served in various posts. In the winter of 1643, he was appointed governor of Hubei and Hunan. When Zhu Yousong was proclaimed emperor in Nanjing, he was made junior vice-president of the Board of War in 1644 and was made governor-general of Hunan, Hubei, Sichuan, Yunnan, Guizhou, and Guangxi in 1645. In early 1645, he was forced to join Zuo Liangyu as he advanced on the Ming court in Nanjing. However, he escaped in Wuchang and fled to Changsha. Two months later Zhu Yujian was proclaimed emperor in Fuzhou and He was appointed president of the Board of War and Grand Secretary of the Dongge (東閣) with the hereditary rank of Earl of Dingxing (定興伯). Meanwhile the remaining forces of Li Zicheng declared their allegiance to He who established the so-called "Thirteen Military Centers" (十三鎮) in Hunan. He requested Zhu to move the court to Ganzhou, Jiangxi, but Zhu was captured in October 1646 in Tingzhou, Fujian, near the Jiangxi border. In November 1646, Zhu Youlang was proclaimed emperor in Zhaoqing, Guangdong and He was made president of the Board of War and Grand Secretary of the Wuyingdian (武英殿). When the Manchus advanced to Hunan, the "Thirteen Military Centers" were defeated and He fled to Wugang, Hunan. When Wugang fell to the Manchus, He joined Qu Shisi (瞿式耜) to defend Guilin and Guangxi while Zhu Youlang fled to Jingzhou, Hunan. He was raised in rank to Marquis of Dingxing (定興侯) after defeating the Manchus at Quanzhou, Guangxi.

The rebellion of Jin Shenghuan (金聲桓) against the Manchus in Jiangxi in June 1648 shifted the center of Manchu attack allowing He to recover a number of cities in Hunan. The following year,  the Manchus attacked the Ming forces in Hunan. On March 3, Xiangtan, Hunan fell and He was captured. When he was captured, he went on a hunger strike for seven days. In the same month, He hanged himself, dying at the age of 58. The Ming court gave him the posthumous title of Prince of Zhongxiang (中湘王) and the posthumous name Wenlie (文烈). In 1776, the Qianlong Emperor canonized him as Zhongcheng (忠誠).

References 

 Zhang Tingyu. History of Ming, vol. 280.
 

1592 births
1649 deaths
Southern Ming people